The Plymouth Barracuda is a two-door pony car that was manufactured by Chrysler Corporation from 1964 through 1974 model years.

The first-generation Barracuda was based on the Chrysler A-body and was offered from 1964 until 1966. A two-door hardtop (no B-pillar) fastback design, it shared a great majority of parts and bodywork with the Plymouth Valiant, except for the huge and distinctive wraparound rear glass.

The second-generation Barracuda, though still Valiant-based, was heavily redesigned. Built from 1967 through 1969, it was available as a two-door in fastback, notchback, and convertible versions.

The third generation, offered from 1970 until 1974, was based on the Chrysler E-body, exclusive to it, and the slightly larger Dodge Challenger. A completely new design, the two-door Barracuda was available in hardtop and convertible body styles.

First generation (1964-1966)

1964
During the development of the Barracuda, one of the worst-kept secrets was Ford's plan to introduce a new sporty compact car based on the inexpensive Falcon chassis and running gear (which was eventually released as the Mustang in mid-model year 1964); the extent of the other changes was not known. Chrysler stylist Irv Ritchie sketched a fastback version of the compact Valiant. Budgets were limited due to research and development of the Chrysler Turbine Car, but the company's executives wanted to have an entry in this emerging and potentially lucrative sporty-compact car market segment, beginning by siphoning off some of the Chevrolet's Corvair Monza's sales. Plymouth's executives had wanted to name the new model Panda, an idea unpopular with its designers. In the end, John Samsen's suggestion of Barracuda prevailed.

Based on Chrysler's A-body, the Barracuda debuted in fastback form on April 1, 1964. The new model used the Valiant's  wheelbase and the Valiant hood, headlamp bezels, windshield, vent windows, quarter panels, doors, A-pillar, and bumpers; the trunk and some of the glass was new. Utilizing the same hybrid design approach as Ford did turning its Falcon into the Mustang significantly reduced Plymouth's development and tooling cost and time for the new model. The greatest effort was put into creating its distinguishing  rear window, a collaboration between Pittsburgh Plate Glass (PPG) and Chrysler designers that created the largest ever installed on a standard production car to that time.

Powertrains were identical to the Valiant's, including two versions of Chrysler's slant-6 six-cylinder engine.

The highest-power option for 1964 was Chrysler's all-new  LA V8. A compact and relatively light engine equipped with a two-barrel carburetor, it produced . The Barracuda sold for a base price of US$2,512 ($ today).

The 1964 model year was the first for the Barracuda and also the last year for push-button control of the optional Torqueflite automatic transmission. This year also marked the first use of the smaller "TorqueFlite 6" (A904) transmission behind a V8.

In the marketplace, the Barracuda was "obviously" a fastback version of the Valiant that had a frugal family transportation image. The sales brochure for the first Barracudas pitched it as a car "for people of all ages and interests." The more "sporty" Mustang was marketed with abundant advertising to young professionals and with its youthful image proved widely successful following its mid-1964 introduction. This became known as the "pony car" niche of modestly appointed compact-sized sedans and convertibles, which came with standard 6-cylinder engines and basic interiors, but could be outfitted with powerful V8s and "custom" appointments and luxury features. The success of the Mustang has long obscured the fact that the Barracuda actually predated Ford's introduction by two weeks. The abbreviated sales season for the 1964 Barracuda totaled 23,443 units compared to the 126,538 Mustangs sold during the same time.

1965

In 1965, the 225 slant-6 became the base engine for the U.S. market, though the  remained the base engine in Canada.

New options were introduced for the Barracuda as the competition among pony cars intensified. The 273 engine was made available as an upgraded Commando version with a four-barrel carburetor, 10.5:1 compression, and a more aggressive camshaft, still with solid tappets.

A new Formula 'S'  package included the Commando V8 engine, suspension upgrades, larger wheels and tires, special emblems, and a tachometer. Disc brakes and factory-installed air conditioning became available after the start of the 1965 model year.

1966

For the 1966 model year the Barracuda received new taillamps, new front sheet metal, and a new instrument panel. The latter had room for oil pressure and tachometer gauges on models so equipped. The 1966 front sheet metal which, except for the grille, was shared with the Valiant, gave a more rectilinear contour to the fenders. Deluxe models featured fender-top turn signal indicators with a stylized fin motif. The bumpers were larger, and the grille featured a strong grid theme. A center console was optional for the first time.

Although the first Barracudas were heavily based on the contemporary Valiants, Plymouth wanted them perceived as distinct models. Consequently, the "Valiant" chrome script that appeared on the  model's trunk lid was phased out at the end of the 1965 model year in the U.S. market, and the large stylized "V" trim above the deck lid was changed to a unique Barracuda fish logo for 1966, though in markets such as Canada and South Africa, where Valiant was a marque in its own right, the car remained badged as Valiant Barracuda until the A-body Barracuda was discontinued.

Second generation (1967–1969)

1967
The second-generation Barracuda was redesigned with model-specific sheet metal, yet still shared many components with the Valiant. It rode on a  wheelbase A-body and was available as a convertible and a notchback hardtop coupe versions, in addition to the fastback design.

The new Barracuda was chiefly the work of John E. Herlitz and John Samsen, with Coke-bottle side contours and heavily revised front and rear ends. Design changes included wider wheel openings, curved side glass, and S-curved roof pillars on the hardtop.

The roofline on the fastback coupe was more streamlined, more steeply raked, and with a much smaller flush rear window in place of the distinctive massive wraparound in the original model. Also, the overall use of chrome trim was more restrained.

During this time the first U.S. Federal auto safety standards were phased in, and Chrysler's response a requirement for side-marker lights distinguishes each model year of the second-generation Barracuda:

1967: no sidemarker lamps or reflectors, and backup lights on the rear valance by the license plate.
1968: round side marker lamps without reflectors, mostly white tail lamps with backup lights in the tail lamp housing.
1969: little changes on the front grille, rectangular side marker reflectors without lamps, and the backup lamps were moved back to the rear valance by the license plate.

As the pony-car class became established and competition increased, Plymouth began to revise the Barracuda's engine options.

1968
In 1968, the 273 was replaced by the  LA engine as the smallest V8 available, and the new  LA four-barrel was released.

Also in 1968, Chrysler made approximately fifty fastback Barracudas equipped with the  Hemi for Super Stock drag racing. These cars were assembled by Hurst Performance and featured items such as lightweight Chemcor side glass, fiberglass front fenders, hood scoop, lightweight seats, sound deadener, and other street features such as rear seats omitted. An included sticker indicated that the car was not for use on public roads; it could run the quarter-mile in the mid-tens in 1968.

A handful of Savage GTs were also built from the second-generation Barracuda.

1969
In 1969, Plymouth placed an increased emphasis on performance. A new option was the Mod Top, a vinyl roof covering with a floral motif, available in 1969 and 1970. Plymouth sold it as a package with seat and door panel inserts done in the same pattern.

The 'Cuda, based on the Formula S option, was available with either the 340, 383 and, new for 1969, the 440 Super Commando V8.

Third generation (1970–1974)

1970-1971

The redesign for the 1970 Barracuda removed all its previous commonality with the Valiant. The original fastback design was deleted from the line and the Barracuda now consisted of coupe and convertible models. The all-new model, styled by John E. Herlitz, was built on a shorter, wider version of Chrysler's existing B platform, called the E-body. Though sharing its platform with the newly launched Dodge Challenger, no exterior sheet-metal interchanged between the sibling cars.

The E-body Barracuda was now "able to shake the stigma of 'economy car'." Three versions were offered for 1970 and 1971: the base Barracuda (BH), the luxury oriented Gran Coupe (BP), and the sport model 'Cuda (BS). 

Beginning mid-year 1970, and ending with the 1971 model, there also was the Barracuda Coupe (A93), a low-end model with the  Slant Six as a base engine, lower-grade interior, and (like other Coupe series Chrysler offered that year) had fixed quarter glass instead of roll-down rear passenger windows. The high-performance models were marketed as 'Cuda deriving from the 1969 option. The E-body's engine bay was larger than that of the previous A-body, facilitating the release of Chrysler's  Hemi for the regular retail market.

The Cuda had the 383  SAE gross (same as Dodge's 383 Magnum) as the standard engine. The 440- and Hemi-equipped cars received upgraded suspension components and structural reinforcements to help transfer the power to the road.

Other Barracuda options included decal sets, hood modifications, and some unusual "high impact" colors such as "Lime Light", "Bahama Yellow", "Tor Red", "Lemon Twist", "Curious Yellow", "Vitamin C", "In-Violet", "Sassy Grass" and "Moulin Rouge".

Swede Savage and Dan Gurney raced identical factory-sponsored AAR (All American Racers) 'Cudas in the 1970 Trans-Am Series. The cars qualified for three pole positions but did not win any Trans-Am races; the highest finish was second at Road America. Four 1970 Hemi 'Cudas were also successfully raced by Chrysler France, from 1970 until 1973. The works team director Henrí Chemin piloted the first car, and then sold it on to friend and privateer J. F. Mas who went on to race it for another two years. This Hemi 'Cuda won four French Group 1 class championships, three on track and one in hill climbing.

The Barracuda was changed slightly for 1971, with a new grille and taillights, seat, and trim differences. This would be the only year that the Barracuda would have four headlights (which the Challenger had for all five years of their concurrent run), and also the only year of the fender "gills" on the 'Cuda model.

The 1971 Barracuda engine options would remain the same as that of the 1970 model, except that the 340 6-Bbl was gone, and the four-barrel carbureted 440 V8 engine was no longer on the options list, but could be had via special order and perhaps a dozen cars were built with it installed; otherwise, the 440-powered Barracudas had a six-barrel carburetor setup instead.

In 1971 the big-block power options offered to the customer were:
 SAE Gross in the 383-2V
 SAE Gross in the 383-4V
 SAE Gross in the 440-6V
 SAE Gross in the 426-8V

In 1970 and 1971 only, the shaker hood (option code N96), elastomeric (rubber) colored bumpers, and the Spicer-built Dana 60 rear axle were available. The shaker hood was available with 340, 383, 440 four-barrel, 440 six-barrel, and 426 Hemi engines. The elastomeric (rubber) colored bumpers were available either as a front-only option, option code A21, or as a front and rear combination, option code A22. The heavy-duty (and heavy) Dana 60, with a  ring gear, was standard equipment with manual transmissions and 440 six-barrel and 426 Hemi engines, and was optional on those with the automatic transmission.

1972-1974

With a new grille and single headlights (very similar to the 1970 model) and four circular taillights for 1972, the Barracuda would remain basically unchanged through 1974, with new bodyside stripes, and minor changes to the bumpers to conform with federal impact standards being the only significant variations. Big block engines (383, 440, & 426 Hemi), heavy-duty suspensions and rear axles, and large/wide tires mounted on  wheels were no longer offered. Additionally; the convertible model was dropped; though a few late build 1971 convertibles were built with 1972 grills and back end panels and provided to Paramount Studios for TV and movie work; being seen on Mannix, The Brady Bunch and other shows. Convenience and comfort items such as power seats, power windows, and upgraded interior (leather seats and plush carpeting) options were dropped, though heavy-duty air conditioning and a sunroof could still be ordered. For 1972 only, three engine choices were offered: a 225 six, the 318 (base engine for both 'Cuda and Barracuda), and a revised 340 detuned to meet emission standards. In addition, all three were tuned to run on low/no-lead gas and were power rated on the NET (installed) method. Three transmissions were offered: a 3-speed manual, the Torqueflite automatic, and the Hurst shifter equipped four-speed. For 1973 federally mandated safety bumpers were added front and rear, and the 225 six was dropped, with the 318 and 340 V8s being the only engine choices. For late production 1973 cars, and for 1974 a slightly more powerful 360 V8 (245 E bodyhp) replaced the 340. Since 1970; optional was a four-speed manual transmission (equipped with a Hurst shifter) mated to a performance ratio (3.55 to 1) rear axle for the 340 and 360 engines, though as many as three cars (in both 1973 and 1974) were built with the 318 engine and Hurst 4-speed thru special orders or factory errors.

As with other American vehicles of the time, there was a progressive decrease in the Barracuda's performance. To meet increasingly stringent safety and exhaust emission regulations, big-block engine options were discontinued. The remaining engines were detuned year by year to reduce exhaust emissions, which also reduced their power output. There was also an increase in weight as bumpers became larger and, starting in 1970, E-body doors were equipped with heavy steel side-impact protection beams. Higher fuel prices following the 1973 oil crisis and performance-car insurance surcharges deterred many buyers as the interest in high-performance cars waned. Sales of pony cars were on the decline. Sales had dropped dramatically after 1970, and while 1973 showed a sales uptick, Barracuda production ended April 1, 1974, ten years to the day after it had begun.

Engines
Engine choices by Chrysler for the 1970-73 Barracuda included the following:
 B:  Slant 6 I6: 1970–71  SAE gross, 1972  SAE net
 C:  Slant 6 I6: 1970–71  SAE gross, 1971-72  SAE net
 G:  LA V8 (2-barrel carburetor, single exhaust): 1970-71  SAE gross, 1971  SAE net, 1972-74  SAE net
 H:  LA V8 (4-barrel carburetor, dual exhaust): 1970-71  SAE gross, 1971  SAE net, 1972-73  SAE net
 J:  LA V8 (3×2-barrel carburetor): 1970  SAE gross, used in AAR Cuda
 L:  LA V8 (4-barrel carburetor, dual exhaust): 1974  SAE net
 L:  B V8 (2-barrel carburetor, single exhaust): 1970  SAE gross, 1971  SAE gross, 1971  SAE net
 N:  B V8 (4-barrel carburetor, dual exhaust): 1970  SAE gross

SAE gross hp ratings were tested with no accessories, no air cleaner, or open headers. In 1971, compression ratios were reduced in performance engines, except the 426 cu in and the high-performance 440 cu in, to accommodate regular gasoline. 1971 was the last year for the 426 Hemi.

Chrysler had plans to continue the 1970 Dodge Challenger T/A for 1971, even publishing advertisements for a 1971 Dodge Challenger T/A. However, no 1971 Dodge Challenger T/A was made. Similarly, no 1971 Plymouth AAR Cuda was made.

The 383 Magnum was the standard engine for the 1970 Dodge Challenger R/T, 1970 Dodge Coronet Super Bee, 1970 Plymouth Cuda, and 1970 Plymouth Road Runner; it was not available in any other models.

Discontinuation
The Barracuda was discontinued after 1974, a victim of the 1973 energy crisis.

A 1975 Barracuda had been planned before the end of the 1970-74 model cycle. Plymouth engineers sculpted two separate concepts out of clay, both featuring a Superbird-inspired aerodynamic body, and eventually reached a consensus upon which an operational concept car could be built. Due to a rapidly changing automotive market due to the energy crisis, the concepts were scrapped and the Barracuda was not put into production for 1975.

Revival attempts
In 2007, Motor Trend magazine reported a rumor that Chrysler was considering reviving the Barracuda in 2009. A new Barracuda would've been badged as a Chrysler, due to the Plymouth brand having been phased out in 2001. However, the Barracuda has not been reintroduced alongside the third generation Dodge Challenger. Rumors of the Barracuda making a comeback were brought up again by Motor Trend in 2012 when reports leaked that the Barracuda would come back in 2014 under the SRT Marque, replacing the Challenger instead of being built alongside it. It was also stated the car would not be of a retro design. Ultimately, the SRT division was re-consolidated under the Dodge banner and the Challenger remained in production without a Barracuda replacement.

After years of silence, an all-new Barracuda, now under the Dodge brand, was shown to FCA dealers along with other future vehicles on August 25, 2015. Based on stretched underpinnings of the rear-drive Alfa Romeo Giulia, it was rumored to be powered by a turbocharged V6 and arrive within the 2019 model year.

Collectibility
The Barracuda (particularly the 1970–1974 E-Body cars) is a collectible car today, with high-performance versions and convertibles commanding the highest prices. The small number of Barracudas remaining in existence is the result of low buyer interest (and low production/sales) when the vehicles were new. The remaining cars of any condition are rare, and the outstanding examples fetch high appraisal values today. Original Hemi super stock Barracudas (and similarly configured Dodge Darts) are now prized collector vehicles, with factory (unaltered) cars commanding high prices.

The 1971 Hemi 'Cuda convertible is now considered one of the most valuable collectible muscle cars. Only thirteen were built, seven of which were sold domestically. The most recent public sale was at the June 2014 Mecum auction in Seattle, where a blue-on-blue 4-speed sold for US$3.5 million (plus buyers premium). Several replica cars were created to look like Hemi 'Cudas and driven by the title character in the late-1990s police procedural Nash Bridges. None of these replica cars had a Hemi V8 under the hood.

References

External links

Barracuda
Rear-wheel-drive vehicles
Muscle cars
Convertibles
Coupés
Pony cars
1970s cars
Cars introduced in 1964